Adam Hunter may refer to:

Adz Hunter (born 1982), Australian actor also known as Adam Hunter
Adam Hunter (golfer) (1963–2011), Scottish golfer
Adam Hunter (politician) (1908–1991), British Labour politician, Member of Parliament for Dunfermline 1964–1979
Adam Hunter (footballer) (born 1981), Australian Football League player for the West Coast Eagles
Adam Mitchell Hunter (1871–1955), Scottish minister, mathematician, astronomer and author of church history
Adam Hunter, a video game character